Raffo was an Italian lager produced from 1919 to 1987 in its homonymous brewery in Taranto. In 1961, the brand was transferred to Peroni which, in turn, belongs to the South African SABMiller. Today, Raffo is produced in the Peroni Brewery in Rome. Peroni was sold in 2016 to the Japanese group Asahi.

History 

Raffo dates to 1919, when Vitantonio Raffo established the brewery in Taranto. Raffo was family-owned until 1961, when it was sold to Peroni, which kept the original recipe, brewery, and employees.
In the 1970s, 48,000 hectoliters were produced, thanks to the beer's diffusion in Basilicata, Lazio, and Campania. The region of Apulia always maintained the highest consumption.

In 1987, Peroni decided to close its brewery in Taranto and transfer production to Bari, putting an end to an important chapter of the city's industrial history. Nonetheless, Raffo continued to be the most popular beer of Taranto.

In 2008, Peroni added Taras, the symbol of Taranto, to the beer's label.
The beer sponsors the city's Taranto Football Club 1927.

References

External links 

 birraraffo.it 
 peroniitaly.com

Beer brands of Italy
Beer in Italy